Global Underground 007: Paul Oakenfold, New York is a DJ mix album in the Global Underground series, compiled and mixed by Paul Oakenfold. The mix is a retrospective look at a set played at Marc Ballrooms in New York City.

Oakey's triumphant return to GU – following the huge international success of his debut mix – was equally well received. This outing came during his 2-year reign at the top of DJ Magazine's Top 100 DJs Poll and off the back of his groundbreaking residency at Cream in Liverpool.

Paul had managed to take the superstar DJ concept to a whole new level, and had redefined what a club residency could be, each and every frenetic week. Meanwhile, GU was now established as the most eagerly anticipated mix series in a crowded and competitive market. This CD was therefore pretty much the ultimate combination.

The music featured comes from a golden age for the kind of driving trance sounds that Paul made his forte. Many of the tracks are Cream Courtyard anthems from the previous 2 years, so the mix holds a special place in the hearts of many who worshipped him at Nation on those amazing Saturday nights.

The album was one of Oakenfold's most successful commercially as it reached number 12 in the UK Compilation Chart.

Track listing

Disc one 
 Mystica - "Bliss (Mystica Mix)" – 5:55
 Jamie Myerson - "Rescue Me" – 3:48
 Taste Experience - "Summersault" – 7:22
 Fathers of Sound - "Water (Fathers of Sound Main Vocal Mix)" – 6:29
 Solar Stone - "Day by Day (Red Jerry Remix)" – 7:43
 Life on Mars - "Life in Mind (L.I.M. Vocal Mix)" – 4:48
 The Coffee Boys - "The Touch (Paul's Remix featuring Chelsea)" – 6:49
 E-Razor - "Mantra" – 7:54
 Lustral - "Everytime (Nalin & Kane Mix)" – 8:23
 Miro - "Paradise" – 9:46
 Three Drives on a Vinyl - "Greece 2000" – 4:28

Disc two 
 Ambrosia - "Inside Your Arms" – 6:09
 Talisman & Hudson - "Leave Planet Earth" – 5:29
 Junk Project - "Composure" – 8:10
 Albion - "Air" – 5:47
 Krystal - "Burning Flame" – 4:07
 Cyclone Tracy - "Balla con Ritmo" – 5:36
 Amoeba Assassin - "Rollercoaster (Oaky's Courtyard Mix)" – 7:30
 Planet Heaven - "Nautical Bodies" – 4:52
 Virus - "Hypnotise (Talisman & Hudson Remix)" – 7:18
 CM - "Dream Universe" – 4:17
 Private Productions - "Sex Drive (M&B's Instructor Mix)" – 5:12
 B.B.E. - "Deeper Love (Symphonic Paradise)" – 4:33

References

External links

Global Underground
Paul Oakenfold albums
DJ mix albums
1998 albums